Admiral Sullivan may refer to:

Sir Francis Sullivan, 6th Baronet (1834–1906), British Royal Navy admiral
Paul E. Sullivan (born 1952), U.S. Navy vice admiral
Timothy S. Sullivan (fl. 1970s–2010s), U.S. Coast Guard rear admiral
William D. Sullivan (born 1950), U.S. Navy vice admiral

See also
Bartholomew Sulivan (1810–1890), British Royal Navy admiral
Thomas Ball Sulivan (1781–1857), British Royal Navy rear admiral